Kazet may refer to:

Kazet, Kalewa, Burma
 Kazet (album)